The Central Arkansas Sugar Bears softball team represents the University of Central Arkansas, located in Conway, Arkansas. The Sugar Bears are a member of the Southland Conference and participate in NCAA Division I college softball. The team is currently led by head coach David Kuhn and plays home games at Farris Field.

History

The Central Arkansas Sugar Bears inaugural softball season was in 1996. From 1996 to 2006, the Sugar Bears competed in the Gulf South Conference at the NCAA Division II level. In 2007, the university moved to NCAA Division I play with the university's move to the Southland Conference. Three coaches have led the Sugar Bears. Natalie Shock coached the team in all but the final year of the Division II period as well as the second year at the Division I level. The team compiled and overall record of 207–296 and a conference record of 109–127 during Shock's eleven-year tenure.  Steve Kissel coached the Sugar Bears for their last year in the Gulf South Conference and their first year as a Southland Conference member. His teams compiled an overall record of 28–76 and 15–48 record in conference play. David Kuhn, the Sugar Bears current head coach, has led the team for seven seasons.  As of the conclusion of the 2015 season, the team has compiled a 209–189 overall record and a 95–88 record in conference play.

In 2015, the Sugar Bears won their first conference tournament championship and received the Southland Conference auto-bid to the 2015 NCAA Division I softball tournament. The team competed in their first NCAA tournament at the Norman Regional.

Year-by-year results

Source:

Post season appearances

Conference Tournaments
Sources:

NCAA Division I Tournament results
The Sugar Bears have appeared in one NCAA Division I Tournament Their record is 0–2.

Awards
NFCA Golden Shoe Award
Jenna Wildeman (2021)

References

External links